Billesley Common is a recreational area of public open space in South Birmingham, England. It is situated along the Yardley Wood Road, between the suburbs of Moseley and Yardley Wood.

Birmingham's rugby union team, Birmingham Moseley Rugby Club of the National League 1 lease part of the common from Birmingham City Council for their pitches and clubhouse. The ground had a seating capacity of 1,450 in the original stand which was replaced by a 5,000 seat stand and clubhouse. Birmingham Moseley's sister club Moseley Oak (formally Selly Oak RFC) have played at Billesley Common since 2008. In 2016, Birmingham Bulldogs announced that they would play their home games at the common.

Billesley Common was first mentioned in 1774 as being 'common wasteland'.

During the 1960s Billesley Common was home to the Birmingham Medics RFC.

References

Bibliography

Rugby union stadiums in England
Parks and open spaces in Birmingham, West Midlands
Sports venues in Birmingham, West Midlands